Martin Schøyen (born January 31, 1940) is a Norwegian businessman, traveller, historian, paleographer and collector of books.

He started collecting books in 1955. Currently his private collection, the Schøyen Collection, contains more than 13,000 manuscript items, the oldest book is about 5,000 years old.

Some manuscripts 
 Biblical manuscript in Coptic language, dated to the 3rd century.
 15 Dead Sea Scrolls
 Sumerian text from the 21st century B.C.; Ur-Nammu's law-code
 Babylonian calendar from 2000–1600 B.C.
 Tutankhamun's signet ring
 MS 5236, an ancient Greek block print dating to the 6th century BC

References

External links 
 The Schøyen Collection

Norwegian businesspeople
Norwegian book and manuscript collectors
1940 births
Living people